The 1995 European Junior Badminton Championships was the 14th tournament of the European Junior Badminton Championships. It was held in Nitra, Slovakia, in the month of April. Danish players dominated with four titles in both Boys' events, Mixed doubles and Mixed team championships while Nederlands won Girls' singles and England secured the Girls' doubles title.

Medalists

Medal table

Final results

References 

European Junior Badminton Championships
European Junior Badminton Championships
European Junior Badminton Championships
European Junior Badminton Championships
International sports competitions hosted by Slovakia